Urvashi Sharma (born 13 October 1984), also known as  Raina Joshi, is an Indian Bollywood actress and model, born in Delhi.

Personal life

She married in February 2012. She changed her name to Raina Joshi.

On 21 January 2014, she gave birth to a baby girl named Samaira. and on 26 November 2017, she gave birth to a boy.

Filmography

Television
2008: Fear Factor: Khatron Ke Khiladi 1 as Contestant/Finalist
2016: Amma as Amma

References

External links

Living people
1984 births
Indian film actresses
Female models from Delhi
Actresses from Delhi
Indian Hindus
21st-century Indian actresses
Actresses in Hindi cinema
Actresses in Telugu cinema
Fear Factor: Khatron Ke Khiladi participants